Gilleasbuig Iain Macmillan  (b.1942) is a former minister of the Church of Scotland. From 1973 until his retirement in September 2013 he served as Minister of St Giles' Cathedral, in Edinburgh, Scotland, which is sometimes described as the mother church of Presbyterianism. He was Dean of the Thistle and is a Chaplain to Queen Elizabeth II. As Dean of the Thistle he was styled "The Right Reverend" and from retiral was styled "The Very Reverend".

Life
He was born in Stirling on 21 December 1942. He graduated from the University of Edinburgh (M.A. and B.D.).

He presided at the Kirking of the Parliament in 1999, 2003, 2007 and 2011.

Before moving to St Giles Cathedral in 1973, he was minister at Portree Parish Church on the Isle of Skye.

Macmillan was widely tipped for the selection as Moderator of the General Assembly in 1996 and again in 2002, but failed to win sufficient support.  According to The Scotsman (30 October 2002), "Although he has a high public profile in the capital, and inside the Kirk, insiders felt he was not universally popular."

In October 1991, St Giles held a Service of Repentance in memory of the victims of the First Gulf War, which was also attended by Muslims. Instead of simply allowing the Muslims to leave the service to carry out their prayers, Reverend Macmillan decided to stop the service twenty minutes after its start and let the Muslims perform their prayers in the Cathedral next to the Holy Table. The Adhan, the Muslim call to the prayer, was made from the pulpit of the cathedral and the prayers were performed in the midst of a Christian congregation of over 1,000. For this he was awarded a Muslim News Award for Excellence.

Macmillan retired as minister of St Giles' Cathedral on 30 September 2013.
His position as Dean of the Thistle was filled by Rev Iain Torrance.

Bibliography
A Workable Belief: Thoughts on the Apostles' Creed (St Andrew Press, 1993)
Understanding Christianity (Dunedin Academic Press, 2004)

Honours
 Elected Fellow, Royal Society of Edinburgh, 2005. 
 Honorary Doctorate (DD), University of St Andrews, 2003.
 Appointed CVO by the Queen, 1999.
 Appointed KVCO by the Queen, 2014
 Honorary Doctorate (Dr.h.c.), University of Edinburgh, 1998.
 Annemarie Schimmel Award for Championing a Muslim Cause, 2009.

References

External links
Cathedral Minister to retire – BBC News, 24 September 2013

Year of birth missing (living people)
Living people
Alumni of the University of Edinburgh
Knights Commander of the Royal Victorian Order
Fellows of the Royal Society of Edinburgh
20th-century Ministers of the Church of Scotland
Place of birth missing (living people)
Deans of the Thistle
Ministers of St Giles' Cathedral
21st-century Ministers of the Church of Scotland